This is a list of films released by The Cannon Group, a defunct group of companies including Cannon Films which operated from 1967 to 1994.

Dewey-Friedland Cannon

Golan-Globus Pre-Cannon

Golan-Globus Cannon 1970s

Golan-Globus Cannon 1980s

Productions

Theatrical releases

Home Video releases

Assonitis-Globus-Pearce Cannon

Cannon Productions

Pathé Productions

Theatrical releases

Home Video releases

See also 

 Lists of films by studio
 21st Century Film Corporation

References 

Lists of films by studio
 
American films by studio
Defunct American film studios